"Dancing On Nails" is the second single released by the American rock band We Are Harlot from their self-titled debut album.

Release 

The song was initially released via the BBC Radio 1 Rock Show with Daniel P. Carter on January 19' 2015. The single was officially released when the band announced the release date of their debut album on January 20 and was also accompanied by the band's first music video. It also serves as the album's opening track, and along with the rest of the album, it was produced by Kato Khandwala at Steakhouse Studios in North Hollywood.

Reception 

The song was called a "...high-energy radio-rock with a taste for ‘80s flash..." by Altpress writer Matt Crane and stated that the music video promoting the song "feels like a night out in Vegas—at one of the cheap casinos". Crane also believes that as a result of Worsnop's vocal strain from performing with his former band Asking Alexandria it has enabled him to sing with more raspier 'rock' vocals.

Track list

Chart performance

References 

2015 singles
Roadrunner Records singles
2015 songs